The Concordia Department (in Spanish, Departamento Concordia) is an administrative subdivision (departamento) of the province of Entre Ríos, Argentina. It is located in the south-east of the province, beside the Uruguay River.

The head town is Concordia.

References

Departments of Entre Ríos Province